The W window system is a discontinued windowing system and precursor in name and concept to the modern X Window System window system.

W was originally developed at Stanford University by Paul Asente and Brian Reid for the V operating system. In 1983, Paul Asente and Chris Kent ported the system to UNIX on the VS100, giving a copy to those working at MIT's Laboratory for Computer Science.

In 1984, Bob Scheifler of MIT replaced the synchronous protocol of W with an asynchronous alternative and named the result X.

Since this time the X window system has gone through many fundamental changes and no longer bears any significant resemblance to W.

See also

 History of free and open-source software

References

Windowing systems